91:an (Eng: № 91) is a popular Swedish comic strip, first created in 1932 with the title En beväringsmans upplevelser och äventyr ("A military man's experiences and adventures"). This name soon changed to 91:an Karlsson, by Rudolf Petersson. It is now published in its own bi-weekly comic book, 91:an, and also as a single strip in the popular weekly women's magazine Året Runt.

The principal character in the strip is Mandel Karlsson, a young man (aged perhaps 20 or 21) doing conscript military service in the Swedish Army, based at the fictional Klackamo Regiment. His number is "91", thus he is widely known in Sweden as "91:an Karlsson", although in the comic strip itself he is almost always referred to as Mandel (Eng: Almond, a very unusual first name), or simply 91:an.

Several of the officers are based on real people Rudolf Petersson met during his national service at the I 16 regiment in Halmstad, Halland between 1916 and 1918. The premises of Klackamo Regiment, and the small town hosting it, Klackamo, are assumed to also be loosely based on the real regiment I 16, plus a quaint depiction of small-town and rural Sweden loosely based on places in Halland.

Originally all the characters wore the blue uniform with brass buttons (possibly a late 19th-century model), but when it was replaced by a more modern uniform in 1939 the new uniform was applied to all characters but 91:an, who kept the outdated version. Since then the uniform of the Swedish army has been changed in 1959 and 1990, but has not resulted in any changes in the uniforms used in the comic strip.

91:an cartoonists
Rudolf Petersson (creator)
Jonas Darnell
Nils Egerbrandt
Jan Gissberg
Gösta Gummesson
Görgen Kronberg
Gert Lozell
Olle Nilsson
Jonny Nordlund
Patrik Norrman
Ola Nyberg
Gunnar Persson
Krister Petersson
Tobias Sjölund
Tommy Strindholt
Bertil Wilhelmsson

Principal cartoon characters in the strip

Conscripts
 91:an Karlsson: Mandel Karlsson (principal character)
 87:an Axelsson: Lars Fjodor Axelsson (the sidekick) (now has his own comic book of republished 91:an strips)
 52:an Johansson
 55:an "Bamsefar"
 57:an Kvist
 63:an Gustavsson
 64:an
 68:an Andersson
 72:an Pettersson
 89:an Olofsson
 106:an Anderberg
 110:an Jyckenberg
 Rosmarie Nilsson

Officers

Klackamo Regiment

 Överste Hector Gyllenskalp (Colonel Gyllenskalp: surname translates as Goldenscalp, a reference to the character's bald head)
 Major Hampus Morgonkröök (Major Morgonkröök: surname roughly translates as morning bend, bend being vernacular expression for alcohol, fr. verb 'Att Kröka' To Bend,)
 Doktor Karl Arne Krank (Regimental doctor, with the rank of Major)
 Kapten Julius Berån (Captain)
 Löjtnant Ferdinand Bourdong (1st Lieutenant)
 Fänrik Filip von Fikonstrååle (2nd Lieutenant)
 Fanjunkare Ansgar Fridht (Warrant Officer)
 Sergeant Emil Korn (Staff Sergeant)
 Sergeant Livén (disappeared from the strip in the 1930s)
 Furir Rickard Revär (Sergeant, frequently the fall guy)
 Furir Konrad Mild
 Korpral Krevad (Corporal, disappeared from the strip in the 1930s)

Others
 General Rufus Bäävenhielm
 General Fredrik Bäävenhielm (no longer in the strip)
 General Jävelberg
 General Knakenplast
 General Herved Pölsen
 Överste Klaage

Civilians
 Elvira Olsson, occasionally named "Johansson", Kapten Berån's maid, and Mandel Karlsson's (and often Lars Fjodor Axelsson's and Rickard Revär's) love interest
 Jenny Andersson, occasionally named "Jonsson", Elvira's cousin, has worked in the Regimental office
 Bottina Axelsson, 87:an's mother, regularly works as a cleaner at the Regimental offices
 Monika Beatrix Berån (Kapten Berån's wife)
 Platina von Blomsterlöök, mother-in-law of Colonel Hector Gyllenskalp
 Doris von Bäävenhielm, wife of Rufus Bäävenhielm
 Tilda Fransson, Mandel's first girlfriend
 Kommunalråd Bertram Fjälkespjut, local councillor
 Harry Gnuthagen, Editor of the Klackamoposten, local newspaper
 Fröken (miss) Grandin, Colonel Hector Gyllenskalp's secretary
 Husmor Greta Gustavsson, the Regimental matron
 Adéle Charlotte Gyllenskalp, wife of Colonel Hector Gyllenskalp
 Johan Karlsson, Mandel's father
 Mandolina Karlsson, Mandel's mother
 Janne Tosesson, TV-reporter for "Uppdrag Förvanskning"
 "Gamle Mäster", works in the Regimental stores
 Hulda, Elvira's aunt
 Ulrika "Ulle", the Canteen girl
 Toftaligan, a local band of petty criminals, drives a hot-rod
 Tomteligan, another local band of criminals, slightly more dangerous than Toftaligan

Films based on the comic strip
91:an Karlsson. "Hela Sveriges lilla beväringsman" (1946) 
91:an Karlssons permis (1947)
91 Karlssons bravader (1951)
Alla tiders 91 Karlsson (1953) 
91 Karlsson rycker in (1955)
91:an Karlsson slår knock out (1957)
91:an Karlsson muckar (tror han) (1959) 
91:an och generalernas fnatt (1977)

See also
91:an comic book
Mandel Karlsson
91 Stomperud, a Norwegian comic character initially based on the Swedish character
Kronblom
Adamson Awards

External links

Note: links are in the Swedish language.
91:an Museum, Halmstad Garrison, Swedish Armed Forces
 Garnisons- och luftvärnsmuseet, Halmstad
www.91an.net - Unofficial fan site

Halland
Swedish comic strips
1932 comics debuts
Military humor
Military comics
Humor comics
Comics set in Sweden